Kandia Camara (born 17 June 1959) is an Ivorian teacher and politician who is the minister of foreign affairs in the government of President Alassane Outtara. She is a professional handball player and was part of the ASC Bouaké team that won African Cup of Champion Clubs in 1981.

Education and career 
Camara earned a degree in English from the University of Abidjan and an Advanced Studies Certificate in Education from Lancaster University in England. Camara is a professional high-level handball player and a two-time champion of  Côte d'Ivoire in 1974 and 1980 and won the African Cup of Champion Clubs in 1981 with ASC Bouaké. From 1983 to 1986, she taught English at the Modern College, de Cocody and at Treich-la-Plène College.  She worked as a specialist English teacher at the Abidjan professional hotel school from 1986 to 2002. She was a member of the national office of the National Union of Secondary Teachers of Côte d'Ivoire (SYNESCI) from 1987 to 1991 and a member of the Association of Women Teachers of Francophone Africa from 1989 to 1991. She was secretary general of the national office of the Union des femmes du PDCI (UFPDCI) and a municipal councillor at the town hall of Cocody  between 1990 and 1994. In 1994, she became the Secretary General of the Rassemblement des Femmes Républicaines (RFR) until 1998 when she assumed the office of the national president of the organisation before resigning in May 2006.

Camara became Deputy mayor of the Municipality of Abobo in 2001 and served in this office until 2003, when she was appointed Special Advisor to the Prime Minister of the Government of National Reconciliation and Transition and remained in this position until 2010. In 2014, she was appointed Minister of National Education.

She served as minister of foreign affairs in the Achi I government and Achi II government.

References 

1959 births
Living people
21st-century Ivorian politicians
21st-century Ivorian women politicians
Education ministers of Ivory Coast
Female foreign ministers
Foreign Ministers of Ivory Coast
Ivorian academics
Ivorian politicians
Women government ministers of Ivory Coast